Floyd Township may refer to:

Floyd Township, Warren County, Illinois
Floyd Township, Putnam County, Indiana
Floyd Township, Floyd County, Iowa
Floyd Township, Sioux County, Iowa
Floyd Township, O'Brien County, Iowa